Textile Recycling for Aid and International Development (TRAID) is a UK charity with at least ten shops in the London area.

They have partnerships with various councils including Brent Council, and "unwanted clothes and shoes in Brent in clearly branded vans directly from your home".

References

External links
Official website

Charities based in London